Mr. Monk in Trouble is the ninth novel based on the television series Monk.  It was written by Lee Goldberg, and was published by Signet Books on December 1, 2009.  Like the other Monk novels, the story is narrated by Natalie Teeger, the assistant of the title character, Adrian Monk.

Plot summary
Adrian Monk and Natalie Teeger are celebrating Halloween in Monk's apartment - Monk by handing out disinfectant wipes instead of candy, and Natalie using what little time she can get to relax (the rest stopping Monk from insulting any trick-or-treaters who dare come to his door). When a young man tries to trick-or-treat dressed in bloody clothing and carrying a knife, Monk knocks him out and tells Natalie he's not in costume - he really has just committed a murder. Natalie ties up the man and calls Captain Stottlemeyer, who shows up in a pirate costume. Randy, dressed as Dirty Harry Callahan, scopes Monk's neighborhood and finds a woman who lives just a few houses down from Monk stabbed to death on her kitchen floor. Monk claims his visitor is the woman's boyfriend and he killed her during an argument. The visitor denies this, but Stottlemeyer arrests him anyway.

The next day, Stottlemeyer sends Monk and Natalie to Trouble, California, a small town known for an unsolved train robbery that happened there in 1962, to investigate the murder of a museum security guard who was a retired San Francisco police officer. There, Natalie falls in love with the police chief, Harley Kelton. The two then investigate and discover that in the 1840s, Trouble was also home to one of Monk's distant relatives, an assayer who possessed skills invaluable to the small town, and exhibited many of the same obsessive compulsive traits as Adrian.  Monk discovers that these seemingly uncorrelated historical facts are connected to the murder. However, Chief Kelton says the murder has already been solved - he's positive an ex-con named Gator Dunsen is responsible. The trio stake out Gator's house, attempting to arrest him, but he fires upon them and is killed in the ensuing shootout. Kelton is reprimanded for trying to apprehend Gator without backup, and Monk and Natalie instead try to question Clifford Adams, the engineer of the train that was robbed. But when they arrive, they find Clifford murdered, and when they try to go for help, Monk falls into a mine shaft, and Natalie dislocates her shoulder when pulling him out.

Natalie is treated and confined to bed, during which Monk solves the case. Believing Monk to be in danger, Natalie takes Chief Kelton to the museum, where Monk has confronted mechanic Bob Gorman, who he claims is the killer. However, when he spots Natalie, he yells that Kelton is Gorman's accomplice.

Here's what happened

The gold from the robbery was melted down and used to line the train's furnace, which the robbers were planning to retrieve afterward as the train was supposed to be scrapped after that fateful run, but the robbery's publicity allowed the train to remain in business, and they never got the chance. When Kelton and Gorman discovered the truth, they plotted to steal the gold for themselves. Gorman killed the guard to replace him and make it easier for himself and Kelton to gain access to the train. However, they needed a scapegoat to get the investigation closed as soon as possible, so they used Gator. The duo drugged Gator and tied him up before Kelton went to tell his theory about Gator to Monk and Natalie, and the shots from inside the house were actually fired by Gorman, who shot Gator and untied him just before he fled the house. But Clifford found out what the duo was up to, so Kelton killed him to keep him quiet.

Kelton holds Monk and Natalie at gunpoint, preparing to kill them and stage their deaths to appear accidental, but Monk has secretly contacted Stottlemeyer, Disher, and the state police, who emerge from hiding. The state police arrest the duo and relieve Kelton of his position, while the gold is recovered as a separate display for the museum.

The next day, Natalie berates Monk after he admits to using her to lure Kelton to the museum in order to expose his involvement, and forces him to apologize by throwing French fries at him. Stottlemeyer and Disher arrive to inform Monk that the state police have not only confirmed his theory but also discovered that the two murders Gorman committed were under Kelton's orders; thus, Kelton will be charged with all three, while Gorman has made a deal to testify against him.

The Case of the Piss-Poor Gold
The novel featured a short story entitled The Case of the Piss-Poor Gold, which was published before the novel was released in the November 2009 issue of Ellery Queen's Mystery Magazine. In the story, Artemis Monk, an assayer in the California gold rush town of Trouble in the 1840s, goes from determining the value of rocks to solving a murder.

Characters

Characters from the television show
Adrian Monk, the titular detective, played on the series by Tony Shalhoub
Natalie Teeger, Monk's assistant and the narrator, played on the series by Traylor Howard
Captain Leland Stottlemeyer, Monk's police friend and ex-partner, played on the series by Ted Levine
Lieutenant Randy Disher, Stottlemeyer's right-hand man, played on the series by Jason Gray-Stanford
Julie Teeger, Natalie's daughter, played on the series by Emmy Clarke

Original characters

Present Day
Clarence Lenihan, a character in the prologue
Manny Feikema, an ex-SFPD cop and security guard at Trouble's history museum
Bob Gorman, an auto mechanic in Trouble and Manny's replacement
Chief Harley Kelton, Chief of Trouble's police and an ex-cop from Boston
Doris Thurlo, Trouble's historian
Ralph DeRosso, conductor and brakeman of the Golden Rail Express
Crystal DeRosso, Ralph DeRosso's daughter
Jake Slocum, one of two robbers hired by DeRosso to carry out the Golden Rail Express
George Gilman, Jake Slocum's partner
Gator Dunsen, a recently released ex-convict arrested by Manny
Detective Lydia Wilder of the Amador County police
Clifford Adams, the Golden Rail Express's boilerman
Edward "Ed" Randisi, the history museum's director
Leonard McElroy, the Golden Rail Express's engineer

19th century characters
Artemis Monk, Monk's 19th century ancestor. He was Trouble's assayer and also helped the sheriff solve crimes that took place in the town. Artemis is known to be responsible for the grid-style layout that comprises Trouble today.
Abigail Guthrie, Artemis Monk's assistant and Natalie's analogue.
Sheriff Wheeler, the Sheriff of Trouble, and Stottlemeyer's analogue. The physical similarities that the sheriff bears to Stottlemeyer are very predominant, right down to Abigail's description of the fact that he wears a thick mustache.
Deputy Parley Weaver, Sheriff Wheeler's right-hand man and Disher's analogue.
Hank Guthrie, Abigail's late husband, and an analogue to Natalie's late husband

References

2009 American novels
Monk (novel series)
Signet Books books